Lowrider, known in Japan as , is a music video game developed and published by Pacific Century Cyber Works and Jaleco Entertainment for PlayStation 2.

Reception

The game received "generally unfavorable reviews" according to the review aggregation website Metacritic. In Japan, Famitsu gave it a score of 28 out of 40.

References

External links
 

2002 video games
Music video games
PlayStation 2 games
PlayStation 2-only games
Video games developed in Japan
Jaleco games
Multiplayer and single-player video games